Alternaria raphani is a fungal plant pathogen.

References

External links
 USDA ARS Fungal Database

raphani
Fungal plant pathogens and diseases
Fungi described in 1944